Thinx is a New York–based company that makes feminine hygiene products. The company is currently under scrutiny for a class action lawsuit  that alleges Thinx products contain harmful toxins including per- and polyfluoroalkyl substances (PFAS) which may be linked to adverse health outcomes like cancer.

The company has three brands: Thinx, Speax, and (BTWN). Thinx is underwear marketed as a product that can be worn during menstruation as a substitute or a supplement to traditional feminine hygiene products. Speax is underwear promoted as a solution for light and moderate incontinence. (BTWN) is a spinoff of the Thinx collection branded for adolescents dealing with menstruation.

Class Action Lawsuit
Thinx agreed to settle in the case of Dickens, et al v. Thinx Incorporated in 2021, pledging to over $5 million dollars of reimbursement payments to those who purchased certain Thinx underwear products between November 2016 and November 2022. Thinx asserts this is not an admission of wrong-doing, though anyone who claims reimbursement funds through the settlement also agrees to waive their right to sue for damages if health problems related to the allegations of the lawsuit occur in the future. Once the settlement is paid out, all those who bought involved Thinx underwear products during the time period in question will no longer have a right to sue Thinx for damages related to the case, regardless of whether the individual claimed reimbursement or not.   
It is possible to retain the right to be part of future lawsuits against Thinx regarding this issue by requesting to be excluded from the settlement.

A final approval hearing will take place in May 2023 to determine whether the settlement is fair.

History
Thinx was founded in 2011 by Antonia Saint Dunbar, Miki Agrawal, and Radha Agrawal. In 2018, Thinx released a new line called (BTWN), which offers period underwear for teens and tweens. In June 2019, Thinx released Thinx Air, a quick-drying version of its underwear. As of 2021, Thinx has released its first activewear collection, which includes leggings, cycle shorts, training shorts, and leotards that are available in multiple colors. The four-piece collection functions like other Thinx underwear, but the gusset design is longer and shaped differently to accommodate active lifestyles. 

In 2019, Kimberly-Clark made a minority investment in Thinx, and in February 2022, it acquired a majority stake in the company.  In May 2022, Maria Molland stepped down as CEO, and the company appointed Meghan Davis as its new CEO.

Products
Thinx underwear comes in a range of styles from boyshorts to thongs and includes two patented technologies. One is to absorb different amounts of blood, and the other absorbs different amounts of urine. The underwear has been reported as being antimicrobial, moisture-wicking, absorbent, and leak resistant. In 2019, Thinx launched Thinx Super, which is a double-absorbency product that claims to hold up to four tampons' worth of flow.

Marketing
Thinx has earned a reputation for its controversial ads. In October 2015, Outfront Media rejected Thinx's subway advertisements due to the fact that the ads used the word "period" and included suggestive visuals of food. Following a social media outcry, the ads were finally allowed to be shown. In 2016, Thinx received attention for featuring trans male models in its ads for period underwear. In November 2016, Thinx launched an ad referencing the Donald Trump Access Hollywood tape. The San Francisco subway banned the ads due to the use of the word "pussy". In November 2017, they created a "PMS truck", a truck visiting three cities, allowing visitors to step inside to shop for Thinx products and talk with brand representatives regarding period health. In 2019, Thinx rolled out a national ad campaign featuring a young boy getting his first period with the tagline: "What if we all had periods?" and subsequent campaigns focused on reducing period stigma by showcasing men. These ads were banned by several TV networks including CBS for being "too graphic".

Reception
TIME named Thinx period panties as one of the best inventions of 2015. Fast Company named Thinx one of the most innovative companies of 2017, pointing to founder Agrawal's promotional campaigns and her application of "high-tech merchandise, considered design, and a rule-breaking philosophy" to launches of new products.

In 2019 Thinx leaders signed a letter condemning the abortion bans being put into place across the country.

See also
 Menstrual cup
 Period underwear
 Tampon
 Lunapads
 Pantyliners

References

External links
Thinx Official Website

Feminine hygiene
Feminine hygiene brands
Menstrual cycle
Personal hygiene products
Incontinence